Rockcastle Creek is a stream in the U.S. state of West Virginia.

Rockcastle Creek takes its name from a nearby rock formation, Castle Rock.

See also
List of rivers of West Virginia

References

Rivers of Wyoming County, West Virginia
Rivers of West Virginia